Finke Gorge National Park is a protected area in the Northern Territory of Australia located about  south of the territory capital of Darwin.
There are good opportunities for bushwalking and bushcamping in the national park.

Heritage
The national park is noted for its ancient palms and Aboriginal cultural sites. The Central Australian Cabbage Palm is found only in Palm Valley and prolifically here. There are around 3000 full grown palms and thousands of small seedlings sprinkled across the park which can get easily trampled by the visitors. Thus the visitors are required to walk along the marked paths to avoid destroying the seedlings. The Finke River is claimed to be one of the oldest catchments in the world, with areas dating back 350 million years.

The national park and nearby areas hold cultural significance to the Western Arrernte Aboriginal people and there is also evidence of early European settlement.

In 1980, it was listed on the now-defunct Register of the National Estate.

Access
A four-wheel-drive route down the Finke River to Illamurta Springs and Watarrka National Park begins at Finke Gorge. Bush walking is another common activity. Kalaranga lookout is an easy 20 minute climb, with views of the rock amphitheatre encircled by rugged cliffs. The Mpaara Walk introduces the mythology of the Western Arrernte Aboriginal culture. In Palm Valley, the Arankaia Walk and the longer Mpulungkinya Walk meander among slender palms, returning across a scenic plateau.

Gallery

See also
 Protected areas of the Northern Territory

References

External links
Official webpage
Official fact sheet and map

National parks of the Northern Territory
Protected areas established in 1966
1966 establishments in Australia
Northern Territory places listed on the defunct Register of the National Estate